Mikra may refer to:
Mikra, Thessaloniki, a town in the Thermi municipality, Greece
Mikra, or Tanakh, the canonical collection of Jewish texts

See also

Micra (disambiguation)
Mikro (disambiguation)
Micro (disambiguation)
Anatolia, also known as Asia Minor (Μικρά Ἀσία, Mikrá Asía, 'small Asia')